47 Commando (Raiding Group) Royal Marines, formerly 1 Assault Group Royal Marines, is a unit of Royal Marine Commandos that specialize in small boat operations, both amphibious and riverine. In addition, it trains and parents the Assault Squadrons of the Royal Marines (ASRM) and their landing craft detachments. It is based at RM Tamar in HMNB Devonport, Plymouth.

History
47 Commando was formed as 1 Assault Group Royal Marines (1 AGRM) at RM Poole in October 2001 to take responsibility for landing craft training. It moved to RM Tamar in August 2013.

On 5 November 2019 the unit was renamed 47 Commando (Raiding Group) Royal Marines, reviving the name of the original 47 (Royal Marine) Commando that served between 1943 and 1946.

Squadrons
The unit has its headquarters at RM Tamar in HMNB Devonport, Plymouth.

Training is delivered at three sites:
 10 (Landing Craft) Training Squadron at RM Tamar.
 11 Amphibious Trials and Training Unit Royal Marines (ATTURM) based at RM Instow in North Devon.
 Royal Navy Board and Search School, .

Operations are delivered by the following units:

 4 Assault Squadron Royal Marines, HMS Albion
 539 Assault Squadron Royal Marines is 3 Commando Brigade's integrated landing craft unit.
 
1 AGRM equipment includes：Landing Craft Vehicle/Personnel.

Training
10 Landing Craft Training Squadron provide training accredited by the Royal Yachting Association for candidates to the landing craft specialisation. This training is delivered at various stages in the individual's career:

 LC3 at entry to the specialisation as a Marine.
 LC2 at promotion to Corporal.
 LC1 at promotion to Sergeant.

See also
British Armed Forces
Royal Navy
List of active Royal Marines military watercraft

References

External links
1 Assault Group Royal Marines

Royal Marine formations and units
Military units and formations established in 2001
2001 establishments in the United Kingdom
Riverine warfare